Broadmarsh is a historic area of Nottingham, England. The area was subjected to large scale slum clearance, creating large spaces used for regeneration. A shopping centre, car park, bus station and road complex created in the early 1970s cut-through the traditional thoroughfares from the city centre to the rail and canalside area. A large courts building was opened in 1981.

The former shopping precinct known as The Broadmarsh Centre (rebranded in 2013 as intu Broadmarsh) was located slightly south of the centre of Nottingham,  on land owned by Nottingham City Council and formerly leased to Intu Properties. It was partly demolished during renovation work by the intu group.

Following Intu's financial collapse resulting in administration during 2020, the council have undertaken public consultations to find an acceptable outcome for eventual redevelopment, including the former multi-storey car park and bus station.

The intended demolition of the remaining precinct structure was delayed due to the City Council trying to obtain funding from central government under the Levelling up funding scheme announced in 2021. The funding bid was rejected in October 2021, meaning demolition work on the eastern end was further delayed until a new bid for £20 million funding can be submitted after spring of 2022. When the announcement of funding was made in January 2023, after postponement from October 2022, Nottingham's bid was unsuccessful.

History
The shopping centre was built in the early 1970s, in an area known as Broad Marsh, that was historically boggy ground, on the outskirts of the medieval town. It was once occupied by the Franciscan Friary known as Greyfriars, Nottingham, which was dissolved in 1539. The area was cleared of all buildings to accommodate the new shopping centre.

During preparation of the site, many caves and cellars dug into the soft sandstone foundations of the city were rediscovered (both ancient and more recent). The caves were to be destroyed as part of the construction, but activism by residents and historians allowed the caves to be preserved. The caves were excavated by staff from Nottingham City Council's museums service and local history enthusiasts. Some were opened to the public as part of the City of Caves museum beneath the shopping centre, and are protected as a Scheduled Monument.

The shopping centre, which opened to the public in 1975, was originally intended to be an Arndale Centre, and the associated parking structure – once voted the "ugliest building in Nottingham" – was known as the Arndale Car Park. The centre underwent a major cosmetic refurbishment in 1988.

Redevelopment

Shopping Centre

Nottingham City Council, owners of the land leasehold on the centre, had as of 2013 been attempting to encourage development at Broadmarsh for "almost two decades". Their 2002 development brief called for a development that "respects the urban grain of the City Centre, with clear streets and urban blocks of buildings to provide for legibility, separate identity and future flexibility" with a clear north–south route linking Nottingham's Old Market Square and railway station, stating, "This route must take the form of a pedestrianised public street."

In November 2002, plans to demolish the existing shopping centre, car park, and adjoining Broadmarsh bus station were approved.

In April 2007, a plan nearly identical to that proposed in 2002 was approved. The three-year redevelopment plan would have involved the demolition of much of the centre, the car park, and the adjoining bus station.

In November 2011, it was announced that Capital Shopping Centres (CSC), owners of the Victoria Shopping Centre, just north of the city centre, had bought Westfield's stake in Broadmarsh. The purchase prompted an investigation by the Office of Fair Trading and the Competition Commission, which was concerned the company's monopoly over the city's shopping centres could negatively impact competition.

In February 2013, CSC changed its name to Intu Properties plc. The new owners wished to start an already planned development of the Victoria Centre, but Nottingham City Council insisted that Broadmarsh must be their "priority" and offered £50 million towards its redevelopment.

A 2013 report mentioned that the centre was "half-empty". The deputy leader of Nottingham City Council said the council would withhold planning permission for the development of the Victoria Centre until they "see bulldozers going into the Broadmarsh Centre".

A new plan for a limited redevelopment of some of the centre received planning approval in June 2015. The plans included the retention of most of the fabric of the 1970s' mall and existing tenants, including Boots, Wilko and BrightHouse, with some cosmetic updating. A nine-screen cinema was to be constructed at a remodelled south-eastern corner, along with new leisure and restaurant spaces. Drury Walk was planned as "Bridlesmith Square", providing a new area outside intu Broadmarsh, targeted at upmarket brands. Counter to the 2002 Development Brief, the new walkway between the city centre and station was planned to be within the existing enclosed shopping mall, under a new glass roof.

Construction company Sir Robert McAlpine Ltd were given the contract to start work on the long-awaited redevelopment of the centre with phased-demolition of the Broadmarsh starting in October 2019. Due to the COVID-19 pandemic, redevelopment work was halted in March 2020. Despite a relaxation of rules allowing construction projects to continue, contractors failed to return to the site in May 2020, with equipment and scaffolding being removed in June 2020, and the public right of way though the centre being closed by Intu citing safety concerns.

Work was halted in June 2020, owing to the owners Intu Properties entering administration. By early July 2020, the part-demolished shopping centre had closed and the site was handed back to the freeholder, Nottingham City Council.

On 6 August 2020, it was announced that the centre would be completely demolished at a cost of £8 million. A mixed-use future development is possible.

As of October 2021, the site remains only partly demolished due to Nottingham City Council's bid to obtain extra government funding. A new pedestrian covered walkway was created through the demolition site, linking the rail station area to the city centre, allowing for future clearance of the remaining 1970s structure. In that month, the funding bid was rejected, meaning demolition work on the eastern end was further delayed until a new bid for extra funding can be submitted after spring 2022. Demolition of the western end of the former shopping area continued as some funding had been obtained from D2N2, the  LEP for East Midlands.

In December 2021, the scheme for redevelopment was reported. The concept, headed by designer Thomas Heatherwick, allows for retention of some structural remains of the centre, as a framework and basis for extensive soft landscaping, provisionally entitled The Frame.

When the announcement of funding was made in January 2023, Nottingham's bid to finish the Broadmarsh was unsuccessful, as was the bid for the nearby Island Quarter development. The city council vowed to continue pursuing outside funding to achieve The Frame concept.

Car park

The 1970s multi-storey car park with bus station underneath was demolished between 2017 and 2018.

In October 2021, it was announced that the new multi-storey car park with 1,200 spaces, 90 motorcycle bays and 81 electric charge points was finished with anticipated opening on 1 November. Nottingham City Council were obligated to finish the car park project, although they had reservations about usage as the shopping centre rebuild was not undertaken, it was hoped the nearby College and Castle would offset the loss of shoppers. The design allowed for a high-level footbridge.

Central Library
The central library originally located at Angel Row off the city centre was closed during the COVID-19 restrictions, with re-opening abandoned due to difficulties in making a COVID-safe environment. Provision was made during redevelopment for a new facility as part of the car park and bus station complex. As of January 2022, no opening date was anticipated as contractors were being invited to submit new estimates for fitting-out of the new building, with the books still in storage.

City Hub
A 2017 plan to redevelop the adjacent land along Canal Street, for the benefit of Nottingham College, was approved. Work started on the £58m City Hub in 2018. It is a six-storey building designed by Sheffield-based architecture firm Bond Bryan. Constructed by Wates it was intended to provide training and employment opportunities including 24 work placements, 16 new jobs, 13 apprentice placements and training for 11 NVQs.

Controversial bus lane
The traffic flow around the old Broadmarsh centre was altered in September 2020, as part of the overall scheme to create a "pedestrian-friendly" area stretching to the City Hub, with a bus-only lane being implemented. In March 2022, responding to a Freedom of Information request, it was confirmed that automatic cameras had instigated fines totalling over £965,000, allocated to Nottingham City Council. The Council commented that the money was used to pay for the camera system, with any surplus going towards "traffic initiatives".

Responding to a Freedom of Information request in January 2022, the council confirmed that, for the period of 1 December 2021 to 12 December 2021, a total of 2,066 Penalty Charge Notices were issued for two camera locations on Canal Street. The council confirmed in February 2022 that it had placed a maintenance contract with the supplier of the ANPR camera system covering the city, at a cost £187,000 for the period of October 2021 to the end of September 2022.

References

External links

Buildings and structures in Nottingham
Shopping centres in Nottinghamshire
Westfield Group
Tourist attractions in Nottingham